Marcello Neri (2 February 1902 – 23 December 1993) was an Italian cyclist. He competed in the individual and team road race events at the 1928 Summer Olympics.

References

External links
 

1902 births
1993 deaths
Italian male cyclists
Olympic cyclists of Italy
Cyclists at the 1928 Summer Olympics
Sportspeople from the Province of Pisa
Cyclists from Tuscany